The R. and F. Cheney Building, also known as the Brown Thomson Building, is a commercial building designed by noted American architect H. H. Richardson. It is located at 942 Main Street, Hartford, Connecticut, and is now on the National Register of Historic Places.

History 
The Cheney Building was constructed 1875–1876 for the Cheney Brothers silk manufacturers in Manchester, Connecticut. It was originally a multipurpose structure with five small shops on the ground floor, and offices and apartments above. For many years it housed Brown Thomson's department store, and later the G. Fox and Company. As of 2007, it has been renamed the Richardson Building, and is now a Residence Inn by Marriott, offices, stores, restaurants, and rehearsal space for The Hartford Stage Company.

The building dominates its corner location and, with towers and attic, is various described as containing five, six, or seven stories. Its facade is organized into three heavy, horizontal tiers of roughly cut, reddish brownstone punctuated with much lighter Berea limestone trim. The lowest tier is defined by a series of huge round arches in striking polychrome bands, a motif repeated in the stories above at an increasingly smaller scale. The ground-floor tier on the Main Street facade features five broad arches above shop windows and doors, the second a two-story arcade of 10 major openings, and the third a single-story arcade of 14 openings.

The building is crowned with low, asymmetric towers at its Main Street corners. The street corner tower was earlier topped by a pyramidal roof.

The building is currently home to a local brewery known as City Steam Brewery, a Residence Inn Marriott, a Fastsigns, and a local restaurant named Pietro's Pizza.

Gallery

See also
National Register of Historic Places listings in Hartford, Connecticut
Louis R. Cheney

References 

 James Francis O'Gorman, Three American Architects: Richardson, Sullivan, and Wright, 1865-1915, University of Chicago Press, 1991, page 47. .
 Jeffrey Karl Ochsner, H. H. Richardson: Complete Architectural Works, MIT Press, 1985, page 58. .
 Hartford Courant article (September 25, 2005)
 Mary Ann Sullivan article (with photographs)

Richardsonian Romanesque architecture in Connecticut
Henry Hobson Richardson buildings
Commercial buildings on the National Register of Historic Places in Connecticut
Office buildings in Connecticut
Residential buildings on the National Register of Historic Places in Connecticut
Buildings and structures in Hartford, Connecticut
Department stores on the National Register of Historic Places
National Register of Historic Places in Hartford, Connecticut
Buildings and structures completed in 1876
Historic district contributing properties in Connecticut